Potulovskaya is a rural locality (a village) in Nizhne-Vazhskoye Rural Settlement, Verkhovazhsky District, Vologda Oblast, Russia. The population was 49 as of 2002.

Geography 
Potulovskaya is located 18 km southwest of Verkhovazhye (the district's administrative centre) by road. Kostyuninskaya is the nearest rural locality.

References 

Rural localities in Verkhovazhsky District